The 2006–07 Detroit Pistons season was the 66th season of the franchise, the 59th in the National Basketball Association (NBA), and the 50th in the Detroit area. The Pistons began the season hoping to improve upon their 64–18 output from the previous season. However, they came eleven wins shy of tying it, finishing 53–29. Whatsoever, these were enough wins to lead the conference at 1st in a lackluster east. After signing Nazr Mohammed and hometown native Chris Webber to offset the loss of Ben Wallace during the off-season, the Pistons were able to reach the Eastern Conference finals for the fifth consecutive season, becoming the first team since the 1992–93 Chicago Bulls to do so. In the Eastern Conference Finals, they were defeated by the eventual Eastern Conference champion Cleveland Cavaliers in six games. The Pistons had the sixth best team defensive rating in the NBA.

Draft picks

Roster

Regular season

Season standings

Record vs. opponents

Game log

Playoffs

|- align="center" bgcolor="#ccffcc"
| 1
| April 21
| Orlando
| W 100–92
| Hamilton, Billups (22)
| Antonio McDyess (9)
| Chauncey Billups (11)
| The Palace of Auburn Hills22,076
| 1–0
|- align="center" bgcolor="#ccffcc"
| 2
| April 23
| Orlando
| W 98–90
| Richard Hamilton (22)
| Rasheed Wallace (11)
| Chauncey Billups (8)
| The Palace of Auburn Hills22,076
| 2–0
|- align="center" bgcolor="#ccffcc"
| 3
| April 26
| @ Orlando
| W 93–77
| Tayshaun Prince (23)
| Antonio McDyess (11)
| Tayshaun Prince (5)
| Amway Arena17,451
| 3–0
|- align="center" bgcolor="#ccffcc"
| 4
| April 28
| @ Orlando
| W 97–93
| Chauncey Billups (25)
| Chris Webber (10)
| Chauncey Billups (6)
| Amway Arena17,451
| 4–0
|-

|- align="center" bgcolor="#ccffcc"
| 1
| May 5
| Chicago
| W 95–69
| Hamilton, Billups (20)
| Antonio McDyess (10)
| Lindsey Hunter (6)
| The Palace of Auburn Hills22,076
| 1–0
|- align="center" bgcolor="#ccffcc"
| 2
| May 7
| Chicago
| W 108–87
| Tayshaun Prince (25)
| Richard Hamilton (9)
| Chauncey Billups (10)
| The Palace of Auburn Hills22,076
| 2–0
|- align="center" bgcolor="#ccffcc"
| 3
| May 10
| @ Chicago
| W 81–74
| Tayshaun Prince (23)
| Prince, R. Wallace (11)
| Chauncey Billups (7)
| United Center23,462
| 3–0
|- align="center" bgcolor="#ffcccc"
| 4
| May 13
| @ Chicago
| L 87–102
| Chauncey Billups (23)
| Antonio McDyess (8)
| Chauncey Billups (8)
| United Center23,099
| 3–1
|- align="center" bgcolor="#ffcccc"
| 5
| May 15
| Chicago
| L 92–108
| Chauncey Billups (17)
| Chris Webber (8)
| Chauncey Billups (6)
| The Palace of Auburn Hills22,076
| 3–2
|- align="center" bgcolor="#ccffcc"
| 6
| May 17
| @ Chicago
| W 95–85
| Richard Hamilton (23)
| Rasheed Wallace (13)
| Chauncey Billups (7)
| United Center23,030
| 4–2
|-

|- align="center" bgcolor="#ccffcc"
| 1
| May 21
| Cleveland
| W 79–76
| Richard Hamilton (24)
| Rasheed Wallace (12)
| Tayshaun Prince (9)
| The Palace of Auburn Hills22,076
| 1–0
|- align="center" bgcolor="#ccffcc"
| 2
| May 24
| Cleveland
| W 79–76
| Rasheed Wallace (16)
| Rasheed Wallace (11)
| Chauncey Billups (6)
| The Palace of Auburn Hills22,076
| 2–0
|- align="center" bgcolor="#ffcccc"
| 3
| May 27
| @ Cleveland
| L 82–88
| Rasheed Wallace (16)
| Antonio McDyess (9)
| three players tied (3)
| Quicken Loans Arena20,562
| 2–1
|- align="center" bgcolor="#ffcccc"
| 4
| May 29
| @ Cleveland
| L 87–91
| Chauncey Billups (23)
| Chauncey Billups (9)
| Tayshaun Prince (4)
| Quicken Loans Arena20,562
| 2–2
|- align="center" bgcolor="#ffcccc"
| 5
| May 31
| Cleveland
| L 107–109 (2OT)
| Richard Hamilton (26)
| Tayshaun Prince (9)
| Richard Hamilton (5)
| The Palace of Auburn Hills22,076
| 2–3
|- align="center" bgcolor="#ffcccc"
| 6
| June 2
| @ Cleveland
| L 82–98
| Richard Hamilton (29)
| three players tied (6)
| Tayshaun Prince (6)
| Quicken Loans Arena20,562
| 2–4
|-

Player statistics

Regular season

|-
| 
| 70 || 70 || 36.2 || .427 || .345 || .883 || 3.4 || style=";"| 7.2 || style=";"| 1.2 || .2 || 17.0
|-
| 
| 14 || 0 || 11.9 || .300 || .200 || style=";"| 1.000 || 1.1 || 1.2 || .4 || .0 || 1.8
|-
| 
| 46 || 6 || 10.1 || .446 || . || .654 || 3.0 || .3 || .2 || .7 || 1.8
|-
| 
| style=";"| 82 || 1 || 16.7 || .415 || .333 || .787 || 3.2 || 1.1 || .6 || .1 || 5.2
|-
| 
| 19 || 0 || 4.9 || .355 || . || .333 || .9 || .3 || .3 || .1 || 1.3
|-
| 
| 75 || 75 || style=";"| 36.8 || .468 || .341 || .861 || 3.8 || 3.8 || .8 || .2 || style=";"| 19.8
|-
| 
| 52 || 0 || 14.3 || .385 || .319 || .909 || .9 || 1.8 || .7 || .1 || 4.9
|-
| 
| 8 || 0 || 15.5 || style=";"| .545 || .000 || .786 || 4.6 || .4 || .6 || style=";"| 1.6 || 5.9
|-
| 
| 67 || 8 || 14.1 || .500 || . || .526 || 2.8 || .2 || .4 || .9 || 5.0
|-
| 
| style=";"| 82 || 3 || 21.1 || .526 || . || .691 || 6.0 || .9 || .7 || .8 || 8.1
|-
| 
| 51 || 33 || 15.2 || .532 || . || .610 || 4.5 || .2 || .5 || .8 || 5.6
|-
| 
| 69 || 18 || 21.4 || .404 || .289 || .725 || 1.6 || 2.7 || .7 || .2 || 6.7
|-
| 
| style=";"| 82 || style=";"| 82 || 36.6 || .460 || style=";"| .386 || .768 || 5.2 || 2.8 || .6 || .7 || 14.3
|-
| 
| 75 || 72 || 32.3 || .423 || .351 || .788 || style=";"| 7.2 || 1.7 || 1.0 || style=";"| 1.6 || 12.3
|-
| 
| 43 || 42 || 29.7 || .489 || .333 || .636 || 6.7 || 3.0 || 1.0 || .6 || 11.3
|}

Playoffs

|-
| 
| style=";"| 16 || style=";"| 16 || 40.6 || .435 || .389 || .832 || 3.3 || style=";"| 5.7 || style=";"| 1.2 || .1 || 18.6
|-
| 
| 8 || 0 || 6.4 || .375 || . || .500 || 1.5 || .1 || .3 || .3 || 1.0
|-
| 
| style=";"| 16 || 0 || 8.4 || .405 || .188 || .667 || 1.3 || .5 || .3 || .1 || 2.3
|-
| 
| style=";"| 16 || style=";"| 16 || 39.9 || .429 || .400 || .865 || 4.3 || 3.8 || .9 || .1 || style=";"| 18.8
|-
| 
| 13 || 0 || 10.2 || .226 || .222 || style=";"| 1.000 || .8 || 1.2 || .5 || .1 || 1.8
|-
| 
| 14 || 0 || 10.4 || style=";"| .667 || .000 || .522 || 2.4 || .1 || .3 || .6 || 4.0
|-
| 
| style=";"| 16 || 0 || 22.1 || .349 || .000 || .731 || 7.1 || 1.1 || .7 || .9 || 5.8
|-
| 
| 2 || 0 || 3.0 || .500 || . || style=";"| 1.000 || 1.5 || .0 || .0 || .0 || 2.5
|-
| 
| 12 || 0 || 11.3 || .355 || .000 || .727 || .8 || 1.2 || .3 || .1 || 2.5
|-
| 
| style=";"| 16 || style=";"| 16 || style=";"| 41.6 || .415 || style=";"| .409 || .759 || 6.4 || 3.8 || .9 || .3 || 14.1
|-
| 
| style=";"| 16 || style=";"| 16 || 35.8 || .437 || .347 || .842 || style=";"| 7.7 || 1.8 || style=";"| 1.2 || style=";"| 1.8 || 14.3
|-
| 
| style=";"| 16 || style=";"| 16 || 25.3 || .524 || .000 || .531 || 6.3 || 1.5 || .9 || .6 || 9.9
|}

Awards and records
Chauncey Billups, All-NBA Third Team
Tayshaun Prince, NBA All-Defensive Second Team

Transactions

References

Detroit Pistons seasons
2006 in sports in Michigan
2007 in sports in Michigan
2006–07 NBA season by team